Dwayne Atkinson (born 5 May 2002) is a Jamaican footballer who plays as a forward for Cavalier.

Club career 
Atkinson featured for his Cavalier F.C. at the youth and senior levels.

International career 

Atkinson was called up to the senior national against Peru.

Career statistics

Club

Notes

International

Honours

 Winner (1): 2021 National Premier League

References

2002 births
Living people
Sportspeople from Kingston, Jamaica
Jamaican footballers
Jamaica youth international footballers
Jamaica international footballers
Association football forwards
National Premier League players
Cavalier F.C. players